Friedrich Christian, Count of Schaumburg-Lippe (16 August 1655 – 13 June 1728) was the second ruler of the County of Schaumburg-Lippe.

Biography
He was born in Bückeburg, the son of Philip I, Count of Schaumburg-Lippe and Landgravine Sophie of Hesse-Kassel (or Hesse-Cassel) (1615–1670).

He became Count on his father's death on 10 April 1681, and reigned until his death at Bückeburg. He was succeeded by his elder surviving son Albert Wolfgang.

Marriage and children
He was married on 4 January 1691 at Langenburg to Countess Johanna Sophia of Hohenlohe-Langenburg (1673–1743). They divorced in 1723. They had six children:

Count Friedrich August (1693–1694)
Count Wilhelm Ludwig (1695–1695)
Countess Sophie Charlotte (1696–1697)
Count Philipp (1698–1698)
Count Albert Wolfgang (1699–1748)
Count Friedrich (1702–1776)

On 3 December 1725 at Brixen, he subsequently married married his mistress, Maria Anna Victoria von Gall (1707–1760), daughter of Johann Michael von Gall and his wife, Maria Anna von Enzenberg.

External links
Schaumburg-Lippe Nobility

1655 births
1728 deaths
People from Bückeburg
Counts of Lippe
House of Lippe
People from Schaumburg-Lippe